Faneuil may refer to:

 Peter Faneuil, (1700–1743), prominent American
 Faneuil Hall, a meeting hall in  Boston, Massachusetts 
 Peter Faneuil School, Boston, Massachusetts